is an agency of the city government of Kyoto, Japan that operates municipal subways and city buses within the city. Previously, it also operated trams and trolley buses.

Subway

The Kyoto Municipal Subway operates the following two lines:
Karasuma Line
Tōzai Line

Bus

The  are major mean of public transport in Kyoto. The buses have been operating since 1928.

Besides the regular commuter routes, the city bus co-operated the city's "Regular Tour Bus" with Keihan Bus.

Tram

Kyoto Municipal Transportation Bureau operated the  until 1978.

Kyoto Electric Railway ( narrow gauge) opened in 1895 as the first electric streetcar in Japan in commercial operation. Subsequently, the narrow gauge lines were closed, rebuilt in standard gauge, or remained as is (Kitano Line).

In its peak of the 1960s, the network was as follows:
Loop line
Gaishū Line (Loop on Higashiyama, Kujō, Nishiōji, Kitaōji streets)
East-West lines
Imadegawa Line
Marutamachi Line
Shijō Line
Shichijō Line
North-South lines
Senbon Line
Karasuma Line
Kawaramachi Line
Shirakawa Line
Fushimi Line
Kitano Line (narrow gauge, closed in 1961)

Because of increasing congestion of road traffic, the tram was abolished in 1978. Part of disused cars were sold to other cities in Japan. As of 2010, Hiroshima Electric Railway and Iyo Railway still operate ex-Kyoto tram cars. One of the cars transferred to Hankai Tramway is now preserved at Old Pueblo Trolley in Tucson, Arizona.

Trolley bus
Between 1932 and 1969, the bureau also operated the Umezu Line, a trolley bus service connecting Shijō Ōmiya (Hankyu Ōmiya Station) and Matsuobashi.

Public relations
The bureau has had events that promote increased ridership of their transit system. In 2013, "Get on! Kyoto City Subway" campaign with anime-style characters began. The characters and logo are also used for Kyoto City Bus.

See also
 List of metro systems

References

External links

Kyoto City Bus & Subway Information Guide - Kyoto Municipal Transportation Bureau
PDF of Kyoto Bus Routes

Intermodal transport authorities in Japan

Transport in Kyoto